Now Kandeh (also Romanized as Naukandeh and Nokandeh) is a city and capital of Now Kandeh District, in Bandar-e Gaz County, Golestan Province, Iran. At the 2006 census its population was 7,601, in 2,058 families.
The people of Now Kandeh speak the Mazandarani language.

Ahmad Mazani Iranian Cleric & Politician is from here as well as the environmental activist Mahlagha Mallah was born nearby.

References 

Populated places in Bandar-e Gaz County
Cities in Golestan Province